Johan Arnoldus "Hans" Muller (24 January 1937 – 1 July 2015) was a Dutch water polo player. He competed in the 1960 and 1964 Summer Olympics and finished eighth on both occasions. He was the Dutch team manager at the 1972 Olympics and a board member of the Dutch Olympic Committee from May 1985 to May 1989. He owned a dress store, which for many years provided clothing for the Dutch Olympic team.

References

1937 births
2015 deaths
Dutch male water polo players
Olympic water polo players of the Netherlands
Water polo players at the 1960 Summer Olympics
Water polo players at the 1964 Summer Olympics
Water polo players from Amsterdam